Cyclin-K is a protein that in humans is encoded by the CCNK gene.

Function 

The protein encoded by this gene is a member of the transcription cyclin family. These cyclins may regulate transcription through their association with and activation of cyclin-dependent kinases (CDKs) through conformational changes. Activation of CDKs through their cyclin partner, creates kinase complexes that will activate target proteins through phosphorylation. Targeted proteins can then ultimately regulate decisions of a cell's progression within the cell cycle to occur. This gene product may be seen to play a dual role in both regulating CDK and RNA polymerase II (RNAP2) activities. Cyclin K only uses RNA recruitment to activate transcription.

Interactions 

Cyclin K has been shown to interact with multiple CDKs including CDK9 and latest CDK12 and CDK13. Roles include helping to phosphorylate C-terminal domains of subunits of RNAP2. Cyclin K is most noted for its associated induction of processive elongation. Also, identified with G1 and S phase cyclin activity, however functions are not deeply understood.

Cyclin K also interacts with HIV nef protein. In the presence of overexpressed Nef protein, Cyclin k and CDK9 binding is induced, inhibiting the positive elongation factor of other CDK9 binding complexes, resulting in an inhibition of specific HIV-1 gene expression.  CDK 13 may also be characterized to interact with HIV mRNA splicing, alongside Nef, and the underexpression of Gag and Env related proteins.

Cyclin K is indispensable for Leukemia growth. SETD1A, is also known to bind Cyclin K through its FLOS domain. The interaction is shown to be important to DNA damage response genes and for Leukemia proliferation.

References

Further reading

External links